Henryk Żyto (1936-2018) was an international speedway rider from Poland.

Speedway career 
Żyto reached the final of the Speedway World Championship in the 1960 Individual Speedway World Championship.

He was the Polish champion in 1963 after he won gold at the Polish Individual Speedway Championship.

World final appearances

Individual World Championship
 1960 -  London, Wembley Stadium - 13th - 4pts
 1962 -  London, Wembley Stadium - Reserve, did not ride

World Team Cup
 1961 -  Wrocław, Olympic Stadium (with Marian Kaiser / Mieczysław Połukard / Florian Kapała / Stanisław Tkocz) - Winner - 32pts (12)
 1963 -  Vienna, Stadion Wien (with Andrzej Pogorzelski / Marian Kaiser / Joachim Maj / Stanisław Tkocz) - 4th - 7pts (4)

References 

1936 births
2018 deaths
Polish speedway riders
Coventry Bees riders